George Brown is an English former professional rugby league footballer who played in the 1940s.

Playing career

International honours
George Brown won a cap for England while at Batley in 1945 against Wales.

Challenge Cup Final appearances
George Brown played right-, i.e. number 12, in Leeds' 15-10 victory over Halifax in the 1941–42 Challenge Cup Final during the 1941–42 season at Odsal Stadium, Bradford, in front of a crowd of 15,250.

References

External links

Living people
Army XIII rugby league players
Batley Bulldogs players
England national rugby league team players
English rugby league players
Leeds Rhinos players
Place of birth missing (living people)
Rugby league second-rows
Year of birth missing (living people)